Generically, a Galilean is an inhabitant of Galilee, a region of Israel surrounding the Sea of Galilee (Kinneret). The New Testament notes that the Apostle Peter's accent gave him away as a Galilean (Matthew 26:73 and Mark 14:70). The Galilean dialect referred to in the New Testament was a form of Jewish Palestinian Aramaic spoken by people in Galilee from the late Second Temple period  through the Apostolic Age . Later the term was used  to refer to the early Christians by Roman emperors Julian and Marcus Aurelius, among others.

History

Biblical narrative
According to the Biblical history of the Twelve Tribes, the region of Galilee was allotted to the tribes of Naphtali and Dan, at points overlapping with the domain of the Tribe of Asher and neighboring the region of Issachar. In the First Book of Kings, the Phoenician ruler King Hiram I of Sidon was awarded twenty cities in the region of Galilee, given to him by Solomon, and the land was subsequently settled by foreigners during or after the time of Hiram. As part of the Northern Kingdom, Galilee and all the land of Naphtali were dispersed and resettled through the influx of foreigners due to the resettlement policy of the Neo-Assyrian Empire during the 8th century BC.

Though Biblical scholarship and historical criticism has doubted the historicity of the twelve tribes themselves since the 19th century, the Neo-Assyrian large-scale deportation and resettlement of their conquered lands was widespread during the late 8th century BCE and remained a policy for the following several centuries.

Classical antiquity

After some early expeditions to Galilee to save the Jews there from attack, the Hasmonean rulers conquered Galilee and added it to their kingdom. Following the Hasmonean conquest, and again after the Roman conquest, an influx of Jews settled in the Galilee, thus doubling its population and changing it from a sparsely inhabited pagan territory to one that is primarily Jewish.

Archaeological evidence, such as ritual baths, stone vessels (which were required by Jewish dietary purity laws), secondary burials, the absence of pig bones, and the use of ossuaries found at Parod, Huqoq, and Hittin, demonstrates a religious similarity between the Galilean Jews and the Jews of Judea during the end of the Second Temple period. The material culture of the 1st century Galilee indicates adherence to the Jewish ritual purity concerns. Stone vessels are ubiquitous and mikvehs have been uncovered in most Galilean sites, particularly around synagogues and private houses.

The Galilean Jews were conscious of a mutual descent, religion and ethnicity that they shared with the Judeans. However, there were numerous cultural differences.

The Pharisaic scholars of Judaism, centered in Jerusalem and Judea, found the Galileans to be insufficiently concerned about the details of Jewish observance – for example, the rules of Sabbath rest. The Pharisaic criticism of Galileans is mirrored in the New Testament, in which Galilean religious passion is compared favorably against the minute concerns of Judean legal scholars, see for example Woes of the Pharisees. This was the heart of a "crosstown" rivalry existing between Galileans and Jewish Pharisees.

Rabbi Yohanan ben Zakkai was born in Arav, Galilee, but upon adulthood moved south into Jerusalem, as he found the Galilean attitude objectionable, decrying them for hating the Torah. According to the Mishnah, Yohanan was the first to be given the title of rabbi. The Talmud says that Yohanan was assigned to a post in Galilee during his training. In eighteen years he was asked only two questions of Jewish law, causing him to lament "O Galilee, O Galilee, in the end you shall be filled with wrongdoers!"

Settlement in the area underwent a dramatic change between roughly the beginning of the first century BCE and the first half of the first century CE: many settlements were established; uninhabited or sparsely populated areas, like the eastern part of the region or hilly areas with limited agricultural potential, experienced a wave of settlement; and the size of the settled area doubled.

During the Great Rebellion (66-70 CE) the Galileans and Idumeans were the most adamant fighters against Rome; they fought the Romans to the death when many Judeans were ready to accept peace terms.

Bar Kokhba revolt
According to Yehoshafat Harkabi, the Galileans were not fazed by the Bar Kokhba revolt because Galilee as a whole either never joined the revolt or, if there was any insurgence, it was quickly ended. University of Haifa professor Menachem Mor states that the Galileans had little (if any) participation in the revolt, with the rebellion chiefly rising in the southern regions of Judea.

Modern period

Unlike the Judeans and the Idumeans, the Galileans survived until the 1930s in the village of Peki'in, after which the Jews were expelled to Hadera by the Arab riots.  Until 500 years ago, Peki'in had a Jewish majority and in Medieval times, Galilean Jews had presence in many villages such as Kafr Yassif, Biriyya, Alma, and more.

Other meanings
Galileans (or Galilæans) was used to refer to members of a fanatical sect (Zealots), followers of Judas of Galilee, who fiercely resented the taxation of the Romans.

Galileans was also term used by some in the Roman Empire to name the followers of Christianity, called in this context as the Galilaean faith. Emperor Julian used the term in his polemic Against the Galileans, where he accuses the Galileans as being lazy, atheistic, superstitious, and their practices derivative of the Greeks. Henrik Ibsen used the term in his play following Julians's goal of reestablishing the Roman religion and the tension between him and his own dynasty, whom fictively claim Galilean descent and relation to Jesus of Nazareth.

See also
Galilee

References

Galilee
Northern District (Israel)
Christian terminology
Ethnic groups in the Middle East